Thomas Henderson CBE (1867/1868 – 28 January 1960) was a Scottish Labour and Co-operative politician.

Henderson was born in Burntisland, Fife. He was apprenticed as a cabinet maker at the age of eleven, but was later to work in the Clydeside and Belfast shipyards.

After nearly thirty years in Belfast, he moved to Glasgow where he was elected to the city council in 1919 as an Independent Labour Party councillor.

At the 1922 general election, he was elected as Member of Parliament (MP) for Glasgow Tradeston, becoming the first Co-operative MP in Scotland. He served on the executive of the National Co-operative Party. With the formation of the First Labour Government he was given the post of Comptroller of the Household and government whip for Scotland.

There was a large swing against Labour at the 1931 general election, and Henderson lost his seat. He was appointed a Commander of the Order of the British Empire in the 1931 Birthday Honours. He regained the seat at the 1935 general election, and held it until 1945, when he retired.

Henderson died in a hospital in Glasgow on 28 January 1960, aged 92.

References

External links

 

1860s births
1960 deaths
Date of birth unknown
Members of the Parliament of the United Kingdom for Glasgow constituencies
Labour Co-operative MPs for Scottish constituencies
UK MPs 1922–1923
UK MPs 1923–1924
UK MPs 1924–1929
UK MPs 1929–1931
UK MPs 1935–1945
People from Burntisland
Commanders of the Order of the British Empire